Bernardo Ruggieri was a Roman Catholic prelate who served as Bishop of Sora (1511–1530).

Biography
On 12 December 1511, Bernardo Ruggieri was appointed during the papacy of Pope Julius II as Bishop of Sora. He served as Bishop of Sora until his resignation in 1530. While bishop, he was the principal co-consecrator of Giovanni Angelo Arcimboldi, Bishop of Novara (1526), and William Duffy (bishop), Auxiliary Bishop of Saint Asaph (1531).

References

External links and additional sources
 (for Chronology of Bishops) 
 (for Chronology of Bishops) 

16th-century Italian Roman Catholic bishops
Bishops appointed by Pope Julius II